Hermannsburg School, originally Deutsche Schule Hermannsburg, is a private school in Hermannsburg, KwaZulu-Natal, South Africa.

History
The Deutsche Schule Hermannsburg was established by German missionaries in 1856, making it the oldest boarding school in the province, then Natal.

In 1965 it had 14 teachers and 307 students.

Description
Hermannsburg School serves Grade levels RRRR (18 months) through Grade 12 (18 years).
 
Hermannsburg has English as its main language of instruction, although it has an intense German language programme. Zulu language, as a subject, is also offered in the school, as a second language alongside Afrikaans. Music and outdoor activities are other focus areas, besides the academic programme.

Campus
There are three boarding facilities in the school and they are available for students in Grades 8-12. The Männerheim serves boys in Grades 8-12. Mädchenheim serves girls in Grades 8 and 9, while Neues Mädchenheim serves girls in Grades 10–12. All the boarding establishments accommodate the scholars in shared rooms of 2 or 3 scholars per room.

The primary school and kindergarten are separate from the High School. Both the junior school and the senior school have their own computer centres and libraries.

The school has extensive sporting facilities, including a swimming pool, tennis/basketball courts, rugby, cricket, hockey and soccer fields as well as volleyball nets.

References

External links

Archived version of previous official website

Hermannsburg
Boarding schools in South Africa
Private schools in KwaZulu-Natal
Educational institutions established in 1856
1856 establishments in South Africa